Haplogroup P also known as P-P295 and K2b2 is a Y-chromosome DNA haplogroup in human genetics. P-P295 is a branch of K2b (previously Haplogroup MPS; P331), which is a branch of Haplogroup K2 (K-M526).

The only primary branches (clades) of P-P295 are P1 (P-M45) commonly found among Siberians and Central Asians, and P2 (P-B253) found in Oceanian populations. P1 is, in turn, the parent node of Haplogroup Q (Q-M242) and Haplogroup R (R-M207), while P2 gave rise to Haplogroup M-P256 and Haplogroup S-M230.

The major subclades of Haplogroups P1, Q and R now include most males among Europeans, Native Americans, South Asians and Central Asians.

Origin and dispersal 

Karafet et al. 2015 suggests an origin and dispersal of haplogroup P from either South Asia or Southeast Asia as part of the early human dispersal, based on the distribution of subclades now classified as P2, and more ancient clades such as K1 and K2. Hallast, Agdzhoyan, et al. concluded that the ancestral Eurasian haplogroups C, D, and F, either expanded from the Middle East or from Southeast Asia. Based on the modern distribution of basal lineages, the authors propose Southeast Asia as place of dispersal for all Eurasian lineages, before the split between West-Eurasian and East-Eurasian (including Oceanian) populations.

According to a study by geneticist Spencer Wells, haplogroup K, from which haplogroup P descend, originated in the Middle East or Central Asia. It is likely that haplogroup P diverged somewhere in South Asia into P1, which expanded into Siberia and Northern Eurasia, and into P2, which expanded into Oceania and Southeast Asia.

Structure 

The subclades of Haplogroup P with their defining mutation, according to the 2016 ISOGG tree:

P (P295/PF5866/S8, 92R7_1, 92R7_2, F91/PF5862/V231)
 P1 (M45/PF5962)
Q (M242)
R (M207, P224, P227, P229, P232, P280, P285, L248.2, V45)
 P2 (B253/Z33760/Z33761/Z33762/Z33763)

Distribution

P(xP1) 
Because P2 (P-B253) was discovered relatively recently, it is not always clear if older studies have screened for it. Therefore, cases of basal P* (also known as P-P295*; K2b2*; PxM45, B253) reported in literature may include P2.

P(xP1) exists at low to moderate levels among various groups in Island South East Asia, the South West Pacific and East Asia.

P* (perhaps P2) is found at its highest rate among members of the Aeta (or Agta), a people indigenous to Luzon who formed from various ancient groups, such as Oceanians and Austronesian peoples from Taiwan. P1 is most common among individuals in Siberia and Central Asia.

P2* was also found in one historical 19th-century Andaman islander, along with P* found among an Indian sample in Malayasia.

P1 (P-M45) 
Many ethnic groups with high frequencies of P1, also known as P-M45 and K2b2a, are located in Central Asia and Siberia: 35.4% among Tuvans, 28.3% among Altai-Kizhi (PxQ-M3,R1), and 35% among Nivkh males.

§ May include members of haplogroup R2.

Q

Near universal in the Kets (95%) of Siberia. Very common in pre-modern Native American populations and Selkups, except for the Na-Dene peoples, where it reaches 50-90%. Also common, at 25-50% in Siberian populations such as the Siberian Tatars, Nivkh, Tuvans, Chukchi, Siberian Eskimos, Northern Altaians, and in 30% of Turkmens.

R
The only discovered case of basal R* (i.e. one that does not belong to R1 or R2) is the Mal'ta Boy in the Upper Paleolithic on the upper Angara River in the area west of Lake Baikal in the Irkutsk Oblast, Siberia, Russian Federation.

R1

R2
Haplogroup R2 is most common in South Asia and south Central Asia, as well as diaspora populations, such as the Romanis.

P2 (P-B253) 
The Aeta (or Agta) people of Luzon in the Philippines have also provided the only known samples of P2 (P-B253).

Notes

References

External links 

Spread of Haplogroup P, from The Genographic Project, National Geographic

P